Wittmundhafen Air Base is a military air base in Germany. It is home to Tactical Air Force Wing 71 (Taktisches Luftwaffengeschwader 71) of the German Air Force (Luftwaffe). Since May 1974 the F-4F Phantom II was operated from the base. German F-4F Phantoms at the base were retired on 29 June 2013. During 2013, the squadron transitioned to the Eurofighter Typhoon. Prior to May 1974, the base was home to the F-104G Starfighter. Up to the mid/late-1980s the wing operated a handful (usually 4) of Dornier Do 28D. The base currently stores all former F-4F Phantoms of the German Air Force.

References

Bases of the German Air Force
Airports in Lower Saxony